"The Artificial Nigger" is a short story by Flannery O'Connor. It was published in 1955 in her short story collection A Good Man Is Hard to Find. The title refers to statues popular in the Jim Crow-era Southern United States, depicting grotesque minstrelsy characters. Like most of her other works, the story reflects O'Connor's Roman Catholic beliefs and acts as a parable.

Plot summary 
Mr. Head and his orphaned ten-year-old grandson, Nelson, live in the Georgia countryside. Mr Head is taking Nelson to visit Atlanta for the first time since Nelson's birth. Nelson is sure he will enjoy the city, but his grandfather tells him that he is naive, and pokes fun at him during their early-morning train ride into town, when Nelson sees a Black person for the first time.

After seeing some impressive buildings and shops, Mr. Head shows Nelson the less-impressive side of the city; Nelson claims that they lead to Hell. They get lost, and walk through a predominantly Black section of town. Not wanting to ask anyone there for directions, Mr. Head finally acquiesces to Nelson's requests and allows the boy to ask a Black woman for directions. She suggests they take the street car back to the train station, but they do not know how to get on it.  The situation is embarrassing for both Nelson and his grandfather.

They continue walking, but remain lost. Taking a short rest, Nelson falls asleep.  When he wakes up, he has lost sight of his grandfather. Panicking, he races down the street and runs into an older woman, knocking her down. When the gathering crowd demands to know who is responsible for the boy, Mr. Head denies knowing him. Nelson feels betrayed and loses respect for the grandfather.

Eventually, they end up in a wealthy suburb, which seems strangely deserted.  Finally, they encounter a man walking his dogs, who points them to the nearest train station. Along the way there, they pass a plaster cast of a Black figure with a watermelon adorning a lawn fence from which the story gets its title. Mr. Head says "They ain't got enough real ones here. They got to have an artificial one." As they stand together gaping at the "Artificial Nigger," both man and boy experience a redemptive epiphany as they simultaneously recognize in the figurine a symbol of human suffering and the imputed mercy that comes from such suffering. The story ends with them leaving the city and, after getting off the train, standing at their whistle stop in a mild state of shock. Mr. Head experiences again this mysterious divine mercy, which "covered his pride like a flame and consumed it", and Nelson says, "I'm glad I've went once, but I'll never go back again!"

References

Short stories by Flannery O'Connor
1955 short stories